C. tubulosa may refer to:
 Cecropia tubulosa, a plant species found in Peru
 Cistanche tubulosa, a parasitic desert plant species